Mare Erythraeum  is a very large dark dusky region of Mars that can be viewed by even a small telescope. The name comes from the Latin for the Erythraean Sea, because it was originally thought to be a large sea of liquid water. It was included in Percival Lowell's 1895 map of Mars.

Under the name of De La Rue Ocean it was included in Procter's 1905 map of Mars.

See also
Geography of Mars

References

External links
Google Mars zoomable map centered on Mare Erythraeum

Albedo features on Mars
Margaritifer Sinus quadrangle